Your Face Tomorrow: Poison, Shadow and Farewell is a novel, the third part of the Your Face Tomorrow trilogy by Spanish writer Javier Marías.

External links 
Poison, Shadow and Farewell at The Guardian 

Novels by Javier Marías
21st-century Spanish novels
2007 novels
Alfaguara books